The 2007–08 season was the ?? season of competitive football in Greece.

Coaches

Below is the list of coaches who left their teams after the start of the season.

European Competition

UEFA Champions League

Third qualifying round
 AEK

(Sevilla FC advances 6 – 1 on aggregate)

Group stage
 Olympiacos

(Olympiacos advances by finishing second in the group with 11 points)

Last 16
 Olympiacos

(Chelsea FC advances 3 – 0 on aggregate)

UEFA Cup

First round
 AEK

(AEK advances 3 – 1 on aggregate)
 Panathinaikos

(Panathinaikos advances 5 – 1 on aggregate)
 Aris

(Aris advances 2 – 2 on the away goals rule)
 Larissa

(Larissa advances 3 – 2 on aggregate)
 Panionios

(Panionios advances 2–1 on aggregate)

Group stage
 AEK

(AEK Athens advances by finishing third in the group with 5 points)
 Panathinaikos

(Panathinaikos advances by finishing second in the group with 9 points)
 Aris

(Aris fail to advance by finishing fourth in the group with 5 points)
 Larissa

(Larissa fail to advance by finishing fifth in the group with 0 points)
 Panionios

(Panionios fail to advance by finishing fourth in the group with 4 points)

Round of 32
 AEK Athens

(Getafe advances 4 – 1 on aggregate)
 Panathinaikos

(Rangers FC advances 1 – 1 on the away goals rule)

Intertoto Cup
 OFI Crete
 Third Round

(Tobol Kostanay advances 2 – 0 on aggregate)

National team

Honours

Club Honours

Player Honours
Player of the Year

Young Player of the Year

Top scorer

Team of the Year

Retirements
 Zisis Vryzas
 Akis Zikos

References

 
Greece